David Allan Robertson (October 17, 1880 – July 15, 1961) was an American academic who served as the 5th president of Goucher College. He was also a professor at the University of Chicago in English and drama.

Early life 
Robertson was born on October 17, 1880, to John Robertson and Christina Mitchell, both immigrants from Scotland. He was a member of the prominent Dawson family, which was associated with McGill University. After high school, he entered the University of Chicago, graduating with Phi Beta Kappa honors in 1902.

Academic career 
During his graduate studies at the University of Chicago, Robertson served as an instructor in English. He eventually became a full professor in English and drama and also served in various roles in the university's administration. From 1918 to 1923, he was an administrator with the Association of American Universities, and from 1924 to 1930, Robertson was an assistant director with the American Council on Education.
In 1930, Robertson was inaugurated as the 6th president of Goucher College. He served in this position for 18 years, stepping down in 1948.

Later years and death 
Robertson died on July 15, 1961, at the age of 80, at his home in Baltimore, Maryland.

References 

1961 deaths
1880 births
University of Chicago alumni
Presidents of Goucher College
People from Chicago
American people of Scottish descent
20th-century American academics